XEUBS is a Mexican radio station that serves La Paz, Baja California Sur. It is owned by the Universidad Autónoma de Baja California Sur.

1180 AM is a United States clear-channel frequency, on which WHAM in Rochester, New York is the dominant Class A station.

External links
 Radio UABCS Facebook
 Radio Locator information on XEUBS

References

Spanish-language radio stations
Radio stations in La Paz, Baja California Sur
University radio stations in Mexico
Radio stations established in 1994
Daytime-only radio stations in Mexico